Spencer Barrett may refer to:

Spencer Barrett (evolutionary biologist) (born 1948), Canadian evolutionary biologist
W. S. Barrett (1914–2001), English scholar also known as Spencer Barrett